A battlefront is a contested armed frontier between opposing forces.

Battlefront may also refer to:
Battlefront (1986 video game)
Battlefront (2007 video game)
Battlefront.com, an American video game publisher
Star Wars: Battlefront, a series of video games
Star Wars: Battlefront (2004 video game)
Star Wars Battlefront (2015 video game)

See also
Pokémon Battle Frontier (disambiguation)